Greg Sullivan is a physicist at the University of Maryland, a Fellow of the American Physical Society and was a team member and spokesperson on the IceCube Experiment at Antarctica.

References

Year of birth missing (living people)
Living people
21st-century American physicists